Sandøyna or Sandøya is the largest island in Gulen Municipality in Vestland county, Norway.  The  island lies just west of the mainland in a large archipelago of islands that sit north of the Fensfjorden, southeast of the Sognesjøen, and south of the Gulafjorden.  The islands of Mjømna and Byrknesøyna lie just west of Sandøyna.  These three islands are connected to the mainland by a series of bridges.  The bridge from Sandøyna to the mainland was completed in 2010, thus eliminating the old ferry route from the island to the mainland.  The largest settlement is the village of Ånneland on the western coast of the island.

See also
List of islands of Norway

References

Islands of Vestland
Gulen